Fallside railway station served the town of Uddingston, South Lanarkshire, Scotland from 1873 to 1953 on the Clydesdale Junction section of the Caledonian main line.

History 
The station opened on 1 August 1872 by the Caledonian Railway. To the north east was the signal box as well as numerous collieries and work sites, one being Bothwell Park Brick Works. The station closed on 1 January 1917 but reopened on 1 May 1919, before closing permanently on 3 August 1953.

Services

References 

Disused railway stations in South Lanarkshire
Former Caledonian Railway stations
Railway stations in Great Britain opened in 1873
Railway stations in Great Britain closed in 1953
1873 establishments in Scotland
1953 disestablishments in Scotland